Ropalopus is a genus of long-horned beetles in the family Cerambycidae. There are about 20 species of Ropalopus found in Eurasia, and a single species, Ropalopus sanguinicollis, found in the northeastern United States and southern Canada.

Species
These 21 species belong to the genus Ropalopus:

 Ropalopus aurantiicollis Plavilstshikov, 1940 c g
 Ropalopus clavipes (Fabricius, 1775) c g
 Ropalopus eleonorae Sama & Rapuzzi, 2002 c g
 Ropalopus femoratus (Linné, 1758) c g
 Ropalopus hanae Sama & Rejzek, 2002 c g
 Ropalopus insubricus (Germar, 1824) c g
 Ropalopus ledereri Fairmaire, 1866 c g
 Ropalopus lederi Ganglbauer, 1882 c g
 Ropalopus macropus (Germar, 1824) c g
 Ropalopus mali Holzschuh, 1993 c g
 Ropalopus nadari Pic, 1894 c g
 Ropalopus nataliyae Danilevsky & Skrylnik, 2014 c g
 Ropalopus ruber Gressitt, 1939 c g
 Ropalopus ruficollis Matsumura, 1911 c g
 Ropalopus sanguinicollis (Horn, 1860) i c g b
 Ropalopus sculpturatus Pic, 1931 c g
 Ropalopus siculus (Stierlin, 1864) c g
 Ropalopus signaticollis Solsky, 1872 c g
 Ropalopus speciosus Plavilstshikov, 1915 c g
 Ropalopus ungaricus (Herbst, 1784) c g
 Ropalopus varini (Bedel, 1870) c g

Data sources: i = ITIS, c = Catalogue of Life, g = GBIF, b = Bugguide.net

References

Further reading

External links

 

Callidiini